The EMD GP18 is a 4-axle diesel-electric locomotive built by General Motors, Electro-Motive Division between December 1959 and November 1963.  Power was provided by an EMD 567D1 16-cylinder engine which generated . The GP18 replaced the GP9 in EMD's catalog.
350 examples of this locomotive model were built for American railroads, 40 units were built for Mexican railroads, 12 were built for export to a Brazilian railroad, 2 were exported to Peru, and 1 was exported to Saudi Arabia.

Design and Production 
The GP18 in many ways resembled its predecessors, the GP7 and GP9. It was designed nearly identically to the two previous models, but differed in having a metal grid over its radiator shutters, while the GP7 and GP9 instead incorporated a design described as looking like "chicken wire". Additionally, the GP18 had 50 more horsepower than the GP9, for a total of 1,800 horsepower.

GP18s could be customized by their buyers: railroads ordered GP18s with either high or low short hoods, with or without dynamic brakes, and in the case of Grand Trunk Western, with the optional addition of steam generators.

Original buyers

References 

 
 
 
 
 
 

GP18
B-B locomotives
Diesel-electric locomotives of the United States
Railway locomotives introduced in 1959
Freight locomotives
Standard gauge locomotives of the United States
Standard gauge locomotives of Mexico
Standard gauge locomotives of Peru
Standard gauge locomotives of Saudi Arabia
5 ft 3 in gauge locomotives
Diesel-electric locomotives of Mexico
Diesel-electric locomotives of Saudi Arabia
Diesel-electric locomotives of Peru